Colinet is an incorporated town located on the northwest arm of St. Mary's Bay in Newfoundland and Labrador, Canada.

Geography
Colinet is notable for two rivers, the Rocky and the Colinet, which enter the sea in or near the town.

The Rocky River has a man-made salmon ladder spanning the   waterfalls at its mouth. Originally not a salmon river because of those falls, the river was seeded with salmon fry in the mid-1980s. The salmon began using the man-made ladder to bypass the falls in 1987. In 2002, the river opened to recreational anglers, making it Atlantic Canada's newest salmon river.

Climate

Demographics 

See also
 St. Mary's Bay (Newfoundland and Labrador)
 Placentia

References

External links
 The Making of a Salmon River: Rocky River, St. Mary's Bay
 the Rocky River Fishway
 Colinet - Encyclopedia of Newfoundland and Labrador, vol. 1, p. 477-478.

Towns in Newfoundland and Labrador